Bayston Hill is a large village and civil parish in central Shropshire, England.

Occupied continuously since before the Middle Ages, the village had a population of 5,079 residents in 2,172 households in the 2011 census. Bayston Hill mainly serves as a dormitory village for nearby Shrewsbury. It has the largest population for a village in Shropshire and the 10th highest population of any Shropshire locality. The village has a larger than average retired population in comparison to many similar Shropshire villages, but lower than the national average. Bayston Hill has three public houses, two built churches (Church of England and Methodist), one primary school called Oakmeadow, and a public library.

Lyth Hill lies to the south of the village.

History

Early history
There is remaining evidence of both an ancient British Iron Age hillfort and a Roman settlement located on the village's high grounds. In the Middle Ages the heavily wooded Bayston Hill and Condover area was established as a Royal hunting forest. A busy rope works, complete with its own windmill built in 1835, existed on Lyth Hill in the 19th century, supplying the many mines, farms and barge owners across the district.

Standing on the east side is the village's oldest archaeological site: a mounded Iron Age bivallate hill fort, relatively low lying for such a structure and oddly named with the Danish name of The Burgs, but probably was not called that until sometime between the 14th and 16th centuries.

The village was surveyed for the Domesday Book during the year 1086, when it was called Begestan. William Pantulf, an Anglo-Norman nobleman, held land there.

Buildings
Great Lyth manor house was built in 1638 but had fallen into dereliction by 1948. In recent years it has been rescued and renovated. The present Lord of Wrentnall, Baron of Pulverbatch, is also the present Lord of Great Lyth. {Farrow, M. MA Cantab, Barony of Pulverbatch, Manors of Pulverbatch, Wrentnall, Great Lyth, Baron of Pulverbatch is R. SPRULES, 7 April 2003, copies at The British Library}.

In 1785 the London architect George Steuart designed and built a brick mansion house, Lythwood Hall for the Blakeway family, which was accessed via a sweeping driveway through landscaped gardens to the west of the village. Steuart went on to build Attingham Hall for the 1st Lord Berwick but Lythwood Hall fell into disrepair under the squireship of the Hulton-Harrop family in the 1890s. It was later split into multi-ownership units.

Bayston Hill was established as a new ecclesiastical parish with the building of Christ Church in 1843 as an amalgamation of sections from the parishes of St. Julian's Shrewsbury, Meole Brace and nearby Condover. The church was built to serve the local miners, quarrymen and railway navvies. The ecclesiastical parish is part of the Diocese of Lichfield.

Modern history
Although the Shrewsbury and Hereford Railway (now the Welsh Marches Line), runs straight past the village, Bayston Hill has never had its own railway station.

The 1920s novels House in Dormer Forest and Seven for a Secret were written at Spring Cottage, Lyth Hill by romantic novelist Mary Webb, who lived near the village on and off for ten years, alternating between Spring Cottage and her London home, until her death in 1927. The action in her most famous novel Precious Bane took place around the nearby Bomere Pool, that she called Sarn Mere. The oldest known ghost in Shropshire, a dead Roman soldier, is also reputed to haunt Bomere Pool, the site of a Roman army camp and its associated civilian settlement.

A further literary connection can be found in the Brother Cadfael medieval detective novels of Ellis Peters, with much of the action in several stories taking place within the traditional forest, lanes and footpaths in and around Bayston Hill, or between the village and other surrounding medieval settlements.

The village became a civil parish in the reorganisation of 1967.

The original 1843 Christ Church church building still stands. A modern successor church was built on a more central site for the newer housing estates in the early 1980s.

In 2001 an application to further extend the Bayston Hill quarry was turned down, after a detailed survey identified six previously unknown historical sites of archaeological importance that would be destroyed by the proposed extension. These included sections of at least one or possibly two AD 43–450 Roman roads, two 1066–1547 medieval or mid 16th century post-medieval roads or trackways, a group of cropmarks suggesting historical earthworks or buildings, and a group of three medieval parish boundary stones.

In August 2003, the section of the A5 road at Bayston Hill was closed, after a large black cat was claimed to have been sighted at the service station. Experts from the West Midlands Safari Park assisted a police helicopter in search for the cat, which was not found.

In early 2012 plans to change Bayston Hill's status to a town were abandoned, following concerns by residents. The plans would have seen a Mayor and Deputy Mayor appointed.

Governance

Parish
The village has a parish council, which contains 15 elected councillors, currently chaired by ex-Indian Army officer, and Amnesty International campaigner James Moraghen. In early 2008 the council took the radical step of appointing two young persons aged between 14 and 18 to represent the views of the village youth at council meetings.

County
The village is part of a Shropshire Council electoral division that returns 3 members to Shirehall. This division is made up of Bayston Hill, Column and Sutton, with a total population at the 2011 Census of 11,982. The current members are Ted Clarke, Liz Parsons and Jon Tandy. With an electorate of over 11,000, the division is the only one in the county to return 3 members.

Westminster
The village is part of the Shrewsbury and Atcham constituency. Daniel Kawczynski of the Conservatives is the current Member of Parliament representing the constituency.

Geography

Bayston Hill stands on an outcropping spur, of a Pre-Cambrian limestone and sandstone sedimentary rock extension of the Longmyndian range, intruding into the Shropshire plain, with major appearances at Longden, Lyth Hill, Bayston Hill, and Sharpstone Hill. North of the River Severn it does not outcrop again until it appears east of Shrewsbury as Haughmond Hill. The sediments were laid down under a vast warm ocean, surrounded by many volcanoes that were ground down by later Ice Age glaciers, which provided the fertile soil that contributed to Bayston Hill becoming a successful farming community throughout medieval times. There are still several active geological fault lines underlying the area; on 2 April 1990 Bayston Hill experienced an earthquake, measuring 5.4 on the Richter Scale, that was centred on Bishop's Castle.

The village lies just three miles south of Shrewsbury, and is separated from the county town by the main A5 Trunk road. It has good road transport links, with easy access to both the A49 and A5. To the south lies the pre-Cambrian Lyth Hill, with Sharpstone Hill standing to the east, the latter now mostly a major sandstone quarry with little of the hill itself now remaining after several hundred years of constant quarrying activities.

Demography

According to the 2001 census, there were 2,103 households containing a population of 5,247, which makes Bayston Hill the most populated village in Shropshire and larger than many of its market towns (such as Church Stretton or Much Wenlock). In 2011, census data showed the number of dwellings increased to 2,172 while the population fell to 5,079. A total of 1,236 residents (24.3%) are aged 65 or over. The majority of residents identify as only English.

Of the 2,146 recorded households in 2001, only 630 had dependent children. Half of the 1,905 owner-occupiers own their own homes outright, with the remainder still having mortgages. Of the 2,919 residents in gainful employment, 264 work exclusively from home, and of those who travel to places of work, 77 cycle, 132 walk, 170 take the bus, and vast majority of 1,966 travel by motor vehicle.

A 2003 housing survey identified that 96 percent of village homes were owner occupied, compared to a borough and national average of only 74 percent. There is a current under-provision of social and housing association properties, particularly in the one-bed and two-bed market for new family starter and retirement housing. It is felt that building of new housing has to be balanced against a general desire amongst residents to keep the village at close to its current size, and prevent further overspill towards Shrewsbury.

Facilities

The village facilities include a Women's Institute, the Mary Webb Library which is open all day on Tuesdays, Thursdays and Fridays and Saturday mornings, and a large doctors' surgery The Beeches Medical Practice. The village hall, known as Bayston Hill Memorial Hall, was built as a war memorial to local men who died serving in World War I, who are listed on a Roll of Honour inside the building, and also honours those who died in World War II, whose names are listed on plaques either side of the main entrance.

There are two built churches in the village. Christ Church, near Oakland School on Glebe Road, is an evangelical Anglican parish and fellowship church. Bayston Hill Methodist Church is on Lansdowne Road. In 2000 another church affiliated to the Kingdom Faith Church movement, The Storehouse, was started which meets in the Memorial Hall.

Within the village are three public houses, The Three Fishes, the Compasses Inn and The Beeches. The Beeches is the only one in the newer part of Bayston Hill; the other two are on the older side of the village on the A49. Another pub on this road, The Fox, was demolished in August 2012 and replaced with housing.

Unlike many modern rural villages, Bayston Hill has managed to retain a compact and busy central parade of shops, that include a supermarket with in-store post office, a chemist, Indian takeaway (mahim),fish & chip shop, coffee shop and charity shop . The village is also served by a ladies hairdressers and several mobile home hairdressers.

The Village Association organises several well-supported annual events, an annual Christmas carol concert at the parade, and distributes a free monthly newsletter publication known as the "Villager" to every village household, which contains useful information about local events and amenities.

Education
There is no secondary school in the village, with children over the age of eleven attending a range of secondary schools in the rest of Shrewsbury or Church Stretton.

There were two primary schools in the village, Longmeadow and Oakland Primary Schools. Falling pupil numbers led to local discussions about amalgamating the schools. The idea was supported by some and opposed by others in the community. In September 2008 the statutory notices were formally served by Shropshire County Council and the Diocese of Lichfield, stating their intent to discontinue both Oakland and Longmeadow schools as from 31 August 2009. The Diocese of Lichfield was invited to establish a new Church of England school in Bayston Hill on 1 September 2009. After a vote, the new establishment was named Oakmeadow and its uniform purple. The children of junior age are educated on the old Longmeadow site, and originally infants were to be educated at the Oakland site. However, the Longmeadow site has been extended to house the whole school, and residents have indicated a preference for the Oakland site to be used by the community. The closed Oakland site is to be sold in 2023 for demolition and redevelopment as a 23-homes site.

Notable people
 Violet Bland (1863–1940), suffragette, born in Bayston Hill, lived on Stretton Road.
 Sir Harold Baxter Kittermaster (1879–1939), colonial governor, was son of a Vicar of Bayston Hill.
 Mary Webb (1881–1927) author, built and lived in Spring Cottage, Lyth Hill near Bayston Hill with her husband for the latter period of her life. While the cottage was being built, she lodged in Bayston Hill.
 Bert Harry (1897–1966) professional footballer notably for Crystal Palace, lived in retirement at Betley Villas, Bayston Hill, from 1963 to his death.
 Flt Lt Eric Lock DSO DFC & Bar (1919 in Bayston Hill - 1941) a Battle of Britain RAF air ace pilot, One of The Few. He is remembered today on the Runnymede Memorial and Eric Lock Road in Bayston Hill is named after him.
 Christopher Timothy (born 1940) TV and film actor lived in the village at Lythwood Hall, portrayed James Herriott in the 1980s, has featured in the BBC soap dramas Doctors and EastEnders.
 Sarah Adlington (born 1986) British judoka athlete who took part in the 2020 Olympics, grew up in Bayston Hill.
 Jake Walker (born 2000) footballer formerly of Aston Villa, now playing in the Cymru Premier, born in Bayston Hill.

See also
Listed buildings in Bayston Hill
 Pulley

References

External links

 New Parish webpage
 Christ Church website
 Bayston Hill Methodist Church
 The Mary Webb Trail

Villages in Shropshire
Hill forts in Shropshire
Shrewsbury and Atcham
Civil parishes in Shropshire